The Devil's Henchman is a 1949 movie featuring Warner Baxter, Mary Beth Hughes, Mike Mazurki, and Regis Toomey.  The film was written by Eric Taylor and directed by Seymour Friedman.

Plot
The daytime insurance agent Jess Arno (Warner Baxter), moonlights as an undercover salvager at night. He sells the loot he finds to a seedy man named Tip Banning. Arno has long time suspected that Tip is in fact the leader of a gang of waterfront smugglers.

Later in the evening, down at the docks in Connie's waterfront tavern, Arno witnesses Tip meeting with Arno's beautiful companion Silky (Mary Beth Hughes), accompanied by Bill Falls (Paul Marion), third mate on a ship that is currently docked in the harbor. Arno hears Bill complain about the size of his cut, and that Silky offers to take him to the head of the organization. They leave the tavern together and Arno follows them. The party goes into a plumbing store, and when Arno steps in after them a while later, he finds Bill's cap on the floor. He is discovered by a giant of a man, the simple-minded Rhino (Mike Mazurki), who works for the smuggler gang and stops him from investigating further.

Rhino takes a liking to Arno and they go back to Connie's tavern to drink and socialize. They get along so well that Rhono invites Arno to share a room with him. Connie (Peggy Converse), the owner of the tavern, tells Tip that night that she wants money to continue keeping quiet about his shady meetings with ship mates at her place. the next day Arno finds a body floating in the bay, and recognizes it as Bill. He calls the police and is questioned by detective Whalen (Ken Christy) about his finding, but he doesn't reveal that he had witnessed Bill's meeting with Tip two nights before. Tip realises that Arno has kept his mouth shut, and as a reward he offers Arno a job in his operation. Arno accepts the offer and later in the day, after escaping from the friendly Rhino, he meets with his government contact.

Arno and the contact investigates a box from Bill's warehouse and discovers that it is empty instead of containing furs as declared. They suspect that the furs have been removed at sea and never entered the dock, but they cannot determine how the stolen cargo was then delivered to shore to be apprehended by Tip. Arno returns to Connie's in the evening and a regular at the bar, a retired old sea captain (Harry Shannon), recognizes Arno. Arno, however, does not reveal any information about who he is. Later Arno slips Rhino a drink with knockout drops, and goes to investigate the plumber's shop. There he discovers a hidden trap door that leads down to the water.

The morning after, Tip tells Arno and Rhino that they will be doing a job that night. He warns them not to leave each other's sight. Through information from his regular contact, an organ grinder (Julian Rivero), Arno sends a message to the authorities to tell about what is going down, but Connie somehow intercepts it. Rhino and Arno meet with the boss of the smuggler gang, who is revealed to be the old sea captain Arno met the night before. All the men take a row boat out to the ship and steal a shipment of furs that have been packaged together. They bring the furs by boat in on the water under the plumbing store and pass the bales up through the trap door. The police are waiting in the store to arrest the gang, since Connie has tipped them off after getting Arno's message. Later, Connie tells Arno that she had been trying to capture the murderers of her husband, the captain of a freighter. All the time she suspected that Arno was no real criminal because "he danced too well for a dock rat."

Cast
Warner Baxter as Jess Arno
Mary Beth Hughes as Silky
Mike Mazurki as Rhino
Regis Toomey as Tip Banning
Peggy Converse as Connie
Harry Shannon as Captain
James Flavin as Sergeant Briggs
Julian Rivero as Organ grinder
Ken Christy as Detective Whalen
William Forrest as Anderson
Alan Bridge as Elmer Hood
Paul Marion as Bill Falls

External links

References

1949 films
1949 crime drama films
American crime drama films
Columbia Pictures films
Films directed by Seymour Friedman
American black-and-white films
1940s English-language films
1940s American films